James Remley Morris (January 10, 1819 – December 24, 1899) was an American lawyer and politician who served as a U.S. Representative from Ohio during the Civil War from 1861 to 1865.

He was the son of Joseph Morris, who was also a member of Congress.

Early life and career 
Born in Rogersville, Pennsylvania, Morris attended the public schools.
He moved with his parents to Waynesburg, Ohio, in 1829.
He moved to Woodsfield, Ohio the next year.
He served two years' apprenticeship at the printing trade in 1833 and 1834.
He studied under private tutor until 1839.
He studied law.

He was admitted to the bar in 1843 and commenced practice at Woodsfield.

Political career
He was appointed county treasurer to fill the unexpired term of his father, who had been elected to Congress.
He was editor and manager of the Spirit of Democracy 1844-1848.
He served as member of the State house of representatives in 1848.
He served as member of the Ohio State Board of Equalization in 1859.

Congress 
Morris was elected as a Democrat to the Thirty-seventh and Thirty-eighth Congresses (March 4, 1861 – March 3, 1865).
He was an unsuccessful candidate for reelection in 1864 to the Thirty-ninth Congress.

Later career and death 
He resumed the practice of his profession at Woodsfield.
He served as judge of the probate court 1872-1877.
Postmaster 1886-1889.

Death
He died in Woodsfield, Ohio, December 24, 1899.
He was interred in Morris Cemetery, near Woodsfield.

Sources

1819 births
1899 deaths
People from Greene County, Pennsylvania
Ohio lawyers
Democratic Party members of the Ohio House of Representatives
19th-century American politicians
People from Woodsfield, Ohio
19th-century American lawyers
Democratic Party members of the United States House of Representatives from Ohio